Jangal-e Gorgi (also Romanized as Jangal-e Gorgī) is a village in Hoseynabad Rural District, Esmaili District, Anbarabad County, Kerman Province, Iran. At the 2006 census, its population was 126, in 29 families.

References 

Populated places in Anbarabad County